Carys Hawkins (born 29 August 1988) is a Welsh football (soccer) player who plays for Fylkir in the Icelandic Úrvalsdeild.

Since the establishment of the Australian W-League in 2008, Hawkins has represented Perth Glory during the winter seasons.

International career
In February 2013 Hawkins was called up to the senior Wales squad for the 2013 Algarve Cup.

References 

Footballers from Cardiff
Welsh women's footballers
Welsh people of Australian descent
Perth Glory FC (A-League Women) players
1988 births
Living people
Damallsvenskan players
Sunnanå SK players
A-League Women players
Expatriate women's footballers in Iceland
Expatriate women's footballers in Sweden
Expatriate women's soccer players in Australia
Women's association football defenders
Wales women's international footballers